Lock is an unincorporated community in Knox and Licking counties in the U.S. state of Ohio.

History
Lock was laid out in 1837. A post office called Lock was established in 1838, and remained in operation until 1902.

References

Unincorporated communities in Knox County, Ohio
Unincorporated communities in Licking County, Ohio
1837 establishments in Ohio
Populated places established in 1837
Unincorporated communities in Ohio